"It's Goin' Down" may refer to:

 "It's Goin' Down" (Descendants song)
 "It's Goin' Down" (X-Ecutioners song)
 "It's Goin' Down" (Yung Joc song)
 It's Goin' Down (album), an album by Ralph Tresvant
 It's Going Down, an antifascist, anarchist website
 "It's Goin' Down", episode 15 in the third season of The Boondocks